

s
S-T Cort
S.A.S.-500

sa

sab-sai 
Sab-Prenase
sabcomeline (INN)
sabeluzole (INN)
Sabril
safingol (INN)
safironil (INN)
safotibant (INN)
sagandipine (INN)
sagopilone (USAN)
Saizen

sal
Sal-Acid
Sal-Plant
Sal-Tropine

sala-sals
SalAc
salacetamide (INN)
Salactic
salafibrate (INN)
Salagen 
salantel (INN)
salazodine (INN)
Salazopyrine
salazosulfadimidine (INN)
salazosulfamide (INN)
salazosulfathiazole (INN)
salbutamol (INN)
salcaprozate sodium (USAN)
salclobuzate sodium (USAN)
salcolex (INN)
saletamide (INN)
salfluverine (INN)
salicylamide (INN)
salinazid (INN)
SalineX
salinomycin (INN)
salirasib (USAN)
Salivart
salmefamol (INN)
salmeterol (INN)
salmisteine (INN)
Salmonine
salnacedin (INN)
Salofalk
Salpix 
salprotoside (INN)
salsalate (INN)
Salsitab

salu-salv
Saluron 
Salutensin 
salverine (INN)

sam-saq
samalizumab (INN)
Samarium (153Sm) lexidronam (INN)
sameridine (INN)
samixogrel (INN)
sampatrilat (INN)
sampirtine (INN)
Sanctura 
sancycline (INN)
Sandimmune 
Sandomigran
Sandostatin (Novartis brand)
Sandril 
sanfetrinem (INN)
SangCya
sanguinarium chloride (INN)
Sanorex 
Sansac 
Sansert 
Santyl
sapacitabine (INN, USAN)
saperconazole (INN)
saprisartan (INN)
sapropterin dihydrochloride (USAN)
sapropterin (INN)
saquinavir (INN)

sar-sav
saracatinib (USAN, INN)
Sarafem 
sarafloxacin (INN)
saralasin (INN)
sarcolysin (INN)
saredutant (INN)
Sarenin 
sargramostim (INN)
sarilumab (USAN)
saripidem (INN)
Sarisol 
sarizotan (USAN)
sarmazenil (INN)
sarmoxicillin (INN)
Sarna (drug)
sarpicillin (INN)
sarpogrelate (INN)
saruplase (INN)
satafocon A (USAN)
satavaptan (INN)
saterinone (INN)
satigrel (INN)
Sativex (GW Pharmaceuticals brand)
satranidazole (INN)
Satric 
satumomab pendetide (INN)
saviprazole (INN)
savoxepin (INN)
saxagliptin (USAN)

sb-sd
SB-265805
Scabene 
Scalpisin
Scandonest 
Scintimun
Scleromate
Sclerosol 
Sclerosol (Bryan) 
scopinast (INN)
scopolamine
Scrubteam Surgical Spongebrush
SDZ ENA 713